Germanium fluoride is a chemical compound of germanium and fluorine which exists in the following forms:
Germanium difluoride, GeF2, a white ionic solid
Germanium tetrafluoride, GeF4, a colorless molecular gas

Germanium compounds